Phenothiazine, abbreviated PTZ, is an organic compound that has the formula S(C6H4)2NH and is related to the thiazine-class of heterocyclic compounds.  Derivatives of phenothiazine are highly bioactive and have widespread use and rich history. The derivatives chlorpromazine and promethazine revolutionized the fields of psychiatry and allergy treatment, respectively. An earlier derivative, methylene blue, was one of the first antimalarial drugs, and derivatives are under investigation as possible anti-infective drugs.  Phenothiazine is a prototypical pharmaceutical lead structure in medicinal chemistry.

Uses
Phenothiazine itself is only of theoretical interest, but its derivatives revolutionized psychiatry, other fields of medicine, and pest management.  Other derivatives have been studied for possible use in advanced batteries and fuel cells.

Phenothiazine-derived drugs 
In 1876, methylene blue, a derivative of phenothiazine, was synthesized by Heinrich Caro at BASF.  The structure was deduced in 1885 by Heinrich August Bernthsen.  Bernthsen synthesized phenothiazine in 1883. In the mid 1880s, Paul Ehrlich began to use methylene blue in his cell staining experiments that led to pioneering discoveries about different cell types.  He was awarded a Nobel Prize based in part on that work.  He became particularly interested in its use to stain bacteria and parasites such as Plasmodiidae – the genus that includes the malaria pathogen – and found that it could be stained with methylene blue.  He thought methylene blue could possibly be used in the treatment of malaria, tested it clinically, and by the 1890s methylene blue  was being used for that purpose.

For the next several decades, research on derivatives lapsed until phenothiazine itself came to market as an insecticide and deworming drug.  In the 1940s, chemists working with Paul Charpentier at Rhone-Poulenc Laboratories in Paris (a precursor company to Sanofi), began making derivatives.  This work led to promethazine which had no activity against infective organisms, but did have good antihistamine activity, with a strong sedative effect. It went to market as a drug for allergies and for anesthesia. As of 2012 it was still on the market.  At the end of the 1940s the same lab produced chlorpromazine which had an even stronger sedative and soothing effect, and Jean Delay and Pierre Deniker attempted to use it on their psychiatric patients, publishing their results in the early 1950s.  The strong effects they found opened the door of the modern field of psychiatry and led to a proliferation of work on phenothiazine derivatives.  The systematic research conducted by chemists to explore phenothiazine derivatives and their activity was a pioneering example of medicinal chemistry; phenothiazine is often discussed as a prototypical example of a pharmaceutical lead structure.

A number of phenothiazines other than methylene blue have been shown to have antimicrobial effects. In particular, thioridazine has been shown to make extensively drug-resistant tuberculosis (XDR-TB) drug-susceptible again and make methicillin-resistant Staphylococcus aureus (MRSA) susceptible to beta-lactam antibiotics. The major reason why thioridazine has not been utilized as an antimicrobial agent (it is a first-generation or "typical" antipsychotic medication) is due to its adverse effects on the central nervous system and cardiovascular system (particularly QT interval prolongation).

The term "phenothiazines" describes the largest of the five main classes of antipsychotic drugs. These drugs have antipsychotic and, often, antiemetic properties, although they may also cause severe side effects such as extrapyramidal symptoms (including akathisia and tardive dyskinesia), hyperprolactinaemia, and the rare but potentially fatal neuroleptic malignant syndrome, as well as substantial weight gain.   Use of phenothiazines has been associated with antiphospholipid syndrome, but no causal relationship has been established.

Phenothiazine antipsychotics are classified into three groups that differ with respect to the substituent on nitrogen: the aliphatic compounds (bearing acyclic groups), the "piperidines" (bearing piperidine-derived groups), and the piperazine (bearing piperazine-derived substituents).

Nondrug applications 
The synthetic dye methylene blue, containing the structure, was described in 1876. Many water-soluble phenothiazine derivatives, such as methylene blue, methylene green, thionine, and others, can be electropolymerized into conductive polymers used as electrocatalysts for NADH oxidation in enzymatic biosensors and biofuel cells.

Phenothiazine is used as an anaerobic inhibitor for acrylic acid polymerization, often used as an in-process inhibitor during the purification of acrylic acid.

Trade names 
Like many commercially significant compounds, phenothiazine has numerous trade names, including AFI-Tiazin, Agrazine, Antiverm, Biverm, Dibenzothiazine, Orimon,  Lethelmin, Souframine, Nemazene, Vermitin, Padophene, Fenoverm, Fentiazine, Contaverm, Fenothiazine, Phenovarm, Ieeno, ENT 38, Helmetina, Helmetine, Penthazine, XL-50, Wurm-thional, Phenegic, Phenovis, Phenoxur, and Reconox.

Former uses
Phenothiazine was formerly used as an insecticide and as a drug to treat infections with parasitic worms (anthelminthic) in livestock and people, but its use for those purposes has been superseded by other chemicals.

Phenothiazine was introduced by DuPont as an insecticide in 1935. About 3,500,000 pounds were sold in the US in 1944. However, because it was degraded by sunlight and air, it was difficult to determine how much to use in the field, and its use waned in the 1940s with the arrival of new pesticides like DDT that were more durable. As of July 2015 it is not registered for pesticide use in the US, Europe, or Australia.

It was introduced as anthelminthic in livestock in 1940 and is considered, with thiabendazole, to be the first modern anthelminthic. The first instances of resistance were noted in 1961. Among anthelmintics, Blizzard et al. 1990 found only paraherquamide to have similar activity to phenothiazine. It is possible that they share the same mode of action. Uses for this purpose in the US are still described but it has "virtually disappeared from the market."

In the 1940s it also was introduced as antihelminthic for humans; since it was often given to children, the drug was often sold in chocolate, leading to the popular name, "worm chocolate." Phenothiazine was superseded by other drugs in the 1950s.

Structure and synthesis
The central C4SN ring is folded in phenothiazines.

The compound was originally prepared by Bernthsen in 1883 via the reaction of diphenylamine with sulfur, but more recent syntheses rely on the cyclization of 2-substituted diphenyl sulfides. Few pharmaceutically significant phenothiazines are prepared from phenothiazine, although some of them are.

Phenothiazines are electron donors, forming charge-transfer salts with many acceptors.

References

External links 
 MSDS 
 Hendricks, Christensen, J.B., and Kristiansen, Jette E. Sonderborg, Denmark. "Antibakterielle Eigenschaften der Phenothiazine: Eine Behandlungsoption für die Zukunft?" Chemotherapie Journal. 13.5. (2004): 203–205. Wissenschaftliche Verlagsgesesellschaft mbH. 21 August 2005. (PDF).
 PubChem Substance Summary: Phenothiazine National Center for Biotechnology Information.
 CDC - NIOSH Pocket Guide to Chemical Hazards